Ahmad Khonsari, also Aḥmad Khvānsārī, or Khvunsārī (1887–1985) was an Iranian Grand Ayatollah and attained marja status after the death of marja Boroujerdi in 1961. In contrast to the other maraji of his time, who lived in the holy cities of Qom or Najaf, he was based in Tehran, where he ran his own hawza. Khonsari was one of the teachers of Ayatollah Khomeini. 

Grand Ayatollah Khonsari came to Qom in 1923 and became one of the leaders of the hawza after the death of Abdul-Karim Ha'eri Yazdi. Together with Mohammad Kazem Shariatmadari and a number of other Iranian Grand Ayatollahs, he was a staunch opponent of the Shah’s White Revolution in 1963. But he felt Khomeini’s direct challenge of the Shah, claiming to speak for the entirety of Iranian religious leadership, went too far. Khonsari openly criticized Khomeini’s behaviour.

Khonsari was a quietist, who believed the clergy should not exercise political power. As such, he opposed Ayatollah Khomeini’s interpretation of the concept of velayat-e faqih.

Biographies 
 Abdollah Motevalli: Ayatullah Seyyed Ahmad Khonsari be Revayat-e Asnad. Markaz-e Asnad-e Enqelab-e Islami – Tehran. 2004. 256 pages.

References

Citations

Cited sources
 

1887 births
1985 deaths
Iranian grand ayatollahs
20th-century Islamic religious leaders
People who have been placed under house arrest in Iran